The Toto is an isolated tribal group residing only in a small enclave called Totopara in the Alipurduar district of West Bengal, India. Totopara is located at the foot of the Himalayas just to the south of the borderline between Bhutan and West Bengal (on the western bank of Torsa river). Geographically the location is 89° 20'E 26° 50'N.

Totos were nearly becoming extinct in the 1950s, but recent measures to safeguard their areas from being swamped with outsiders have helped preserve their unique heritage and also helped the population grow. The total population of Totos according to 1951 census was 321 living in 69 different houses at Totopara. In 1991 census, the Toto population had increased to 926 who lived in 180 different houses. In the 2001 census, their number had increased to 1184 - all living in Totopara.

Anthropologists agree that the Toto culture and language is totally unique to the tribe, and is clearly distinguished from the neighbouring Rajbongshis, Koch, Mech or the Bhutanese Sharchop tribes.

Physical features and ethnic identity
The Totos are considered having Mongoloid features. Toto language belongs to Tibeto-Burman family of sub-Himalayan group, as classified by Hodgson and Grierson. A script was developed for the language by community elder Dhaniram Toto in 2015, and has seen limited but increasing use in literature, education, and computing; a proposal for encoding this script was accepted by the Unicode technical committee on October 8, 2019. It was added to the Unicode Standard with the release of version 14.0 in September 2021. Most of the young members can speak Bengali and Nepali, which are the mediums of instruction in the local schools.

Totopara: The Toto village
It lies 22 km from Madarihat, the entrance of Jaldapara National Park. So, it can be safely assumed that the Totos live near the northern edges of this forest. The Toto localities of the village are sub-divided into six segments - Panchayatgaon, Mandolgaon, Subbagaon, Mitranggaon, Pujagaon and Dumchigaon. Totopara also has a settlement of Nepali-speaking people. A primary school was established in the village in 1990. Later in 1995, a high school with hostel facility was also established there. There is one primary healthcare centre in Totopara.

Society
Toto family is patrilocal in nature dominated by nuclear type. However, joint family is not rare. Monogamy is common form of marriage among the Toto but polygamy is not prohibited. If a man's wife dies, he may marry the deceased wife's younger sister, but a woman cannot marry her deceased husband's brother. On the death of a spouse, the husband or wife must remain single for twelve months before he or she is free to remarry. There are various ways of acquiring mates viz., (1) marriage by negotiation (Thulbehoea), (2) marriage by escape (Chor-behoea), (3) marriage by capture (Sambehoea) and (4) love marriage (Lamalami). There is no custom of divorce among the Totos.

Food habits
Though they make their main food from marua (a kind of millet), the staple food of the Totos now includes rice, chura (parched rice), milk and curd. They also eat meat, generally goat, pork, venison, poultry and fish of all kinds. Women eat the same food as men and there are no restrictions of any kind on the widows.

Totos also drink a fermented liquor called Eu, made from fermented marua, rice powder and malt, which is served warm in Poipa (wooden glasses). Eu is drunk on all occasions.

Houses

Totos live in elevated bamboo huts. These are raised on machans (raised platforms), and have straw thatches. There is a single log placed to get to the hut, and this log is meant to be drawn up at night.

Religion
They define themselves close to nature, they mainly perform Nature worship. The Totos have two main gods whom they worship:

 Ishpa - He is supposed to live in the Bhutan hills, and causes sickness when displeased. The Totos offer him animal sacrifices and Eu.
 Cheima - She keeps the village and its people safe from troubles and sicknesses. She is also offered rice, fowls and Eu.

The Totos have priests, also offer their worship and sacrifices on their own. Ishpa is worshipped in the open outside the house and Cheima inside the house.

Of late, there are a few Christian converts among the tribe, largely attributed to Christian missionary works.

Economic activities
Totos cultivate land. The Totos are not active farmers and hence do not cultivate a particular crop to a great extent. Every home has a kitchen garden surrounded by bamboo fences; in these gardens they grow vegetables, potatoes and bananas, among others. Sometimes they trade with traders from the outside world. Some Totos raise cows and pigs as an occupation.

At different stages of history, the Toto tribe has been moving away from a subsistence economy to market economy. Further, the transformations of the village from community ownership of land to individual land holding and from isolated tribal group to a multi-ethnic habitat have also taken place in the recent past.

See also 
 Toto language
 Duarshi

References

 A.K. Mitra - District Census Handbook, Jalpaiguri 1951, Appendix VIII, Directorate of Census Operations, West Bengal.
 Charu Chandra Sanyal - The Meches and the Totos - Two Sub-Himalayan Tribes of North Bengal. A North Bengal University publication.
 Bimalendu Majumdar (1998) The Totos: Cultural and Economic Transformation of a Small Tribe in the Sub-Himalayan Bengal. Academic Enterprise, Calcutta. .
 Sarit Kumar Chaudhuri (2004) Constraints of Tribal Development, Mittal Publications, New Delhi. , .
 M.K. Chowdhuri (2005) "The Totos", in Sarit Kumar Chaudhuri and Sucheta Sen Chaudhuri (eds) Primitive Tribes in Contemporary India: Concept, Ethnography and Demography, Volume 1, Mittal Publications, Delhi. , .

External links 
 Ethnologue profile
 Totos of Totopara - A Primitive Tribal Group of West Bengal

Tribes of West Bengal
Indigenous peoples of South Asia
Ethnic groups in India
Sino-Tibetan-speaking people
Social groups of West Bengal
Scheduled Tribes of India
Alipurduar district